Andrew Crawford (October 24, 1917 – March 18, 1994) was a Scottish stage, film and television actor.

Career
A former publicist, he made his film debut in The Smugglers (1947), and with Rank's support, proceeded to make a name for himself with prominent roles during the late forties. These included parts in movies such as Broken Journey (1948), Trottie True, Diamond City and Boys in Brown (all 1949). On Stage he performed at the Comedy Theatre, London on 17 March 1946, in the Green Room Rags, playing opposite John Witty, Harold Warrender and Louise Hampton in And No Birds Sing.

Smaller roles followed and he later turned character actor in films such as Shadow of the Cat (1961) and 80,000 Suspects (1963), as well as television series including The Buccaneers, The Adventures of Robin Hood, Danger Man, Dr. Finlay's Casebook, The Last of the Mohicans (BBC 1971) and Crown Court.

Filmography

References

Bibliography
 David Castell. Richard Attenborough: a pictorial film biography. Bodley Head, 1984.

External links

1917 births
1994 deaths
Scottish male film actors
Scottish male stage actors
Scottish male television actors
Male actors from Glasgow
20th-century Scottish male actors